Borajno (Cyrillic: Борајно) is a village in the municipality of Čajniče, Bosnia and Herzegovina.

References

Populated places in Čajniče